Francis "Frank" O'Hara (11 August 1872 – 24 June 1944) was an Australian rules footballer who played with South Melbourne in the Victorian Football League (VFL).

Notes

External links 
		

1872 births
1944 deaths
Australian rules footballers from Melbourne
Sydney Swans players
People from South Melbourne